Geneviève Schmidt (born October 19, 1978) is a Canadian actress. She is most noted for her performance in the film Compulsive Liar (Menteur), for which she was nominated for Best Supporting Actress at the 22nd Quebec Cinema Awards in 2020.

She has also appeared in the films Paul à Québec, Kiss Me Like a Lover (Embrasse-moi comme tu m'aimes), Threesome (Le Trip à trois), The Fall of the American Empire (La Chute de l'empire américain) and The Time Thief (L'Arracheuse de temps), the television series Les Hauts et les bas de Sophie Paquin, Trauma, Unité 9, Mensonges, Lâcher prise, District 31 and La Maison-Bleue, and roles on stage.

References

External links

1978 births
21st-century Canadian actresses
Canadian film actresses
Canadian stage actresses
Canadian television actresses
Actresses from Quebec
French Quebecers
Living people